Heat Wave, also known as Heatwave, is a professional wrestling event produced by the WWE for its NXT brand division. It was originally a pay-per-view event produced by Eastern/Extreme Championship Wrestling that took place annually from 1994 to 2000. The 1998-2000 iterations of Heat Wave aired on pay-per-view (PPV), while the 1997 iteration was an Internet pay-per-view (iPPV). 

The intellectual property and all footages from the seven Heat Wave events are now owned by WWE since 2003. On July 26, 2022, WWE revived the Heat Wave name for its 2022 event.

Dates, venues and main events

References

External links
 
 
 

Heat Wave
Recurring events established in 1994
Recurring events disestablished in 2000
1994 establishments in Pennsylvania
2000 disestablishments in California
Recurring events established in 2022